Events from the year 1828 in China.

Incumbents
 Daoguang Emperor (8th year)

Events
 Unknown date – Guangdong Pharmacy Store, as predecessor of Watsons a cosmetics and pharmacy retailer around Southeast Asia, was founded.

Establishments 
 Guangyun Temple is a Buddhist temple located in Cangyuan Va Autonomous County of Yunnan, China. first built in 1828 by the Yunnan government

References